Tetratheca shiressii is a species of flowering plant in the quandong family that is endemic to Australia.

Description
The species grows as a small, ascending or decumbent shrub to 30–75 cm in height. The oval leaves are 4–12 mm long and 6 mm wide. The flowers are deep lilac-pink, with petals 10–20 mm long, appearing mostly from July to October.

Distribution and habitat
The range of the species includes the Watagans and the Bulli area in eastern New South Wales, where the plants grow in heath on sandy, swampy or rocky sites.

References

shiressii
Flora of New South Wales
Oxalidales of Australia
Taxa named by William Blakely
Plants described in 1925